Kingdom of Rust is the fourth studio album from British indie rock band Doves. The album was released on 6 April 2009 in the UK via Heavenly Recordings. Kingdom of Rust was met with generally positive critical acclaim, and entered the UK Albums Chart at number 2. Two singles were released from the album: the title track, released a week prior to the album in March 2009, which charted at number 28 on the UK Singles Chart; and "Winter Hill", released in July 2009, which became the band's first single not to chart in the top 100.

The album was born from a tumultuous time in Doves' history, and followed a four-year gap between their last album Some Cities in 2005, at the time the longest period between albums from the band. Doves would tour to promote the album throughout 2009, culminating in a recording hiatus in 2010 which would subsequently last until 2020.

Production
The band recorded the album in a converted farmhouse barn in Cheshire, England over the course of 2006 through early 2009. Producer John Leckie, who has worked with Radiohead, The Stone Roses, and The Fall among others, was set to co-produce the entire album with the band, but was unable due to previous commitments. Instead, Leckie produced two tracks from the album—"Winter Hill" and "10:03" (as well as the B-side "Push Me On")—and the band worked with Dan Austin on the remaining nine songs. Tom Rowlands of the electronic music duo The Chemical Brothers also provided the song arrangement for "10:03".

The album was borne out of a strained writing and recording process. Between previous album Some Cities and Kingdom of Rust, vocalist/bassist Jimi Goodwin lost both of his parents, guitarist/vocalist Jez Williams split up from a girlfriend after seven years together, and all three band members suffered writer's block. "You'd think, 'Great, the amount of material I'll get from this' – but it went the opposite way. I couldn't concentrate on anything," Jez said in an interview with Simon Hattenstone of The Guardian. In the same interview, the band admitted that Kingdom of Rust became something of an "albatross" to finish, with the trio having been "obsessed over the idea that they were just repeating themselves": "If it sounds familiar, get rid [of it]," said Jez. "That was the golden rule."

Release
The album was preceded by first single "Kingdom of Rust" on 30 March 2009. Doves also offered the album's lead track "Jetstream" as a free download on their website, starting from 28 January 2009. Regarding "Jetstream", the band mentioned being fans of the Vangelis score to Blade Runner, and wrote the song as "an imaginary song for the closing credits on Ridley Scott's classic." The German band Kraftwerk was another stated influence for "Jetstream". In an interview with NME, the band said "House of Mirrors" is "about your past haunting you." A documentary on the making of the album (produced by Soup Collective and directed by long-time Doves collaborator Matthew Norman), as well as a track-by-track discussion with Jimi and Andy, premiered exclusively on the official NME website in mid April 2009. The single "Kingdom of Rust" entered the UK Singles Chart at number 28, while second single "Winter Hill" became the band's first single to fail to enter the Top 100, peaking at number 148. A third single release for "House of Mirrors" was canceled.

In promotion for the album, Doves appeared on Later... with Jools Holland on 14 April 2009, performing "Kingdom of Rust", "Winter Hill", and "10:03". They later appeared on the American late-night talk shows Last Call with Carson Daly on 28 May 2009, which featured a pre-recorded video of the band performing "Kingdom of Rust" live at the Wiltern Theatre in Los Angeles on 16 May 2009, and then on Late Night with Jimmy Fallon on 5 June 2009, performing "The Outsiders".

The album is dedicated to Jimi Goodwin's father, Francis James Goodwin, who died on 23 December 2008.

In a 2010 interview discussing the band's first best-of compilation album The Places Between, Goodwin elaborated on the band's collective desire to take a break from recording and touring after Kingdom of Rust, a routine he described as an "album-tour-album-tour treadmill": "After Kingdom of Rust, we really do need to recharge the batteries in that respect... It's nice just to have a bit of breathing space. We just wanted to get off that whole album-tour-album-tour treadmill. None of us are ready to face going into the studio for another two years." The band then embarked on a recording hiatus, which subsequently lasted until 2020 and their fifth studio album The Universal Want.

Reception

Kingdom of Rust was met with positive reviews. At Metacritic, which assigns a normalized rating out of 100 to reviews from mainstream critics, the album has received an average score of 77, based on 23 reviews. Both The Independent and Digital Spy awarded the album 5 out of 5 stars, Gigwise gave the album 4.5 out of 5 stars and noted that the album is "the most daring album of Doves' career to date," and The Observer noted in a glowing review that, "Previous albums never quite lived up to the band's facility for knockout singles, but this one holds the attention. There's a dreamy, addictive sadness to proceedings, their customary gruff melancholy now inflated to match the panoramic setting."

Track listing

Release history

Instrumentals of Rust
On , instrumental versions of all 11 tracks on the album were released as Instrumentals of Rust, exclusively to digital download outlets worldwide.

Track listing
 "Jetstream" (Instrumental) – 5:32
 "Kingdom of Rust" (Instrumental) – 5:13
 "The Outsiders" (Instrumental) – 3:29
 "Winter Hill" (Instrumental) – 5:20
 "10:03" (Instrumental) – 4:05
 "The Greatest Denier" (Instrumental) – 3:59
 "Birds Flew Backwards" (Instrumental) – 2:54
 "Spellbound" (Instrumental) – 5:42
 "Compulsion" (Instrumental) – 5:16
 "House of Mirrors" (Instrumental) – 4:18
 "Lifelines" (Instrumental) – 4:25

Release history

Credits
 All songs written by Jez Williams, Jimi Goodwin, and Andy Williams.
 All instruments played by Doves except where stated.
 Produced by Doves and Dan Austin, except:
 "Winter Hill" and "10:03" produced by John Leckie and Doves.
 Engineered by Dan Austin, except:
 "Winter Hill" and "10:03" engineered by Adam Whittaker and Dan Austin.
 "Jetstream"
 Recorded at Frank Bough Sound III.
 Mixed by Michael H. Brauer at Quad Studios, NYC.
 Pro Tools engineer and mix assistant – Will Hensley.
 "Kingdom of Rust"
 Recorded at Frank Bough Sound III and Green Gates, Eyam.
 Mixed by Michael H. Brauer at Quad Studios, NYC.
 Pro Tools engineer and mix assistant – Will Hensley.
 Piano – Martin Rebelski.
 Violin 1 – Belinda Hammond.
 Violin 2 – Oliver Morris.
 Viola – Alexandra Fletcher.
 Cello – Elinor Gow.
 "The Outsiders"
 Recorded at Frank Bough Sound III.
 Mixed by Michael H. Brauer at Quad Studios, NYC.
 Pro Tools engineer and mix assistant – Will Hensley.
 "Winter Hill"
 Recorded at Rockfield Studios and Frank Bough Sound III.
 Mixed by Michael H. Brauer at Quad Studios, NYC.
 Pro Tools engineer and mix assistant – Will Hensley.
 "10:03"
 Recorded at Rockfield Studios and Frank Bough Sound III.
 Mixed by Dan Austin and Jez Williams at Frank Bough Sound III and Modern World Studios.
 Arranged by Tom Rowlands.
 Piano – Martin Rebelski.
 "The Greatest Denier"
 Recorded at Frank Bough Sound III.
 Mixed by Michael H. Brauer at Quad Studios, NYC.
 Pro Tools engineer and mix assistant – Will Hensley.
 "Birds Flew Backwards"
 Recorded at Frank Bough Sound III.
 Mixed by Dan Austin and Doves at Modern World Studios.
 Mix assistant – Zac Froud.
 Dilruba – Baluji Shrivastav.
 Violin 1 – Belinda Hammond.
 Violin 2 – Oliver Morris.
 Viola – Alexandra Fletcher.
 Cello – Elinor Gow.
 "Spellbound"
 Recorded at Frank Bough Sound III.
 Mixed by Michael H. Brauer at Quad Studios, NYC.
 Pro Tools engineer and mix assistant – Will Hensley.
 "Compulsion"
 Recorded at Frank Bough Sound III.
 Mixed by Michael H. Brauer at Quad Studios, NYC.
 Pro Tools engineer and mix assistant – Will Hensley.
 "House of Mirrors"
 Recorded at Frank Bough Sound III.
 Mixed by Dan Austin and Jez Williams at Frank Bough Sound III and Modern World Studios.
 Mix assistant – Zac Froud.
 Piano – Martin Rebelski.
 "Lifelines"
 Recorded at Frank Bough Sound III and Moolah Rouge, Stockport.
 Mixed by Michael H. Brauer at Quad Studios, NYC.
 Pro Tools engineer and mix assistant – Will Hensley.
 Piano – Martin Rebelski.
 Mastered by Bob Ludwig at Gateway Mastering, Portland, Maine.
 Sleeve design by Rick Myers; shot on location at Northlandz, Flemington, New Jersey.
 Band photo by Deirdre O'Callaghan.
 For Francis James Goodwin (9 May 1943 – 23 December 2008).

Charts

References

Doves (band) albums
2009 albums
Heavenly Recordings albums
Albums produced by Dan Austin